This is a list of notable people from Amsterdam.

Born in Amsterdam 

The following were born or adopted in Amsterdam. Some became famous after they moved away.

A 

 Bertus Aafjes (1914–1993), writer
 Willem Jan Aalders (1870–1945)
 Hans Aarsman (born 1951) photographer, author and academic lecturer
 Jan van Aartsen (1909–1992) politician and jurist
 Mavis Acquah (1978)
 Co Adriaanse (1947), football trainer
 Leo Adriaenssen (1945)
 Pieter Aertsen (1508–1575) painter in the style of Northern Mannerism. 
 Stella Agsteribbe (1909–1943), gymnast
 Cris Agterberg (1883–1948) artist and ceramist.
 Achmed Ahahaoui (1983), football player
 Jan Akkerman (born 1946) guitarist
 Willeke Alberti (born 1945) singer and actress
 Willy Alberti (1926-1985; real name: Carel Verbrugge), singer and actor
 Carel Alberts (1927–2006)
 Ernst van Altena (1933–1999) poet, writer and translator. 
 Ferdinand van Altena (1936–2006)
 Manon Alving (1923), actor
 Martin van Amerongen (1941–2002) journalist, publisher, columnist and author
 Willeke van Ammelrooy (1944), actor
 Herman Agatho des Amorie van der Hoeven (1829–1897)
 Hans Andreus (1926–1977) poet and writer
 Edwin van Ankeren (1968), football player
 Caroline Ansink (born 1959) musician, music educator and composer.
 Jarchinio Antonia (1990), football player
 Mitch Apau (1990), football player
 Karel Appel (1921–2006) painter, sculptor and poet.
 Armando (1929-2018) real name: HD van Doodeweerd; painter, sculptor and writer.
 Willem Arondeus,(1894–1943) artist, author and WW11 resistance member
 Maurits Aronson (1903–1989)
 Abraham Asscher (1880–1950)
 Lodewijk Asscher (born 1974) politician and jurist 
 Eli Asser (1922-2019)
 Tobias Asser (1838–1913) lawyer and legal scholar.
 Raymond Atteveld (1966), football player and football trainer
 Swami Atulananda (1870–1966)
 Hendrick Avercamp (1585–1634), painter
 Lion Axwijk (1984), football player

B 

 Tine Baanders (1890–1971) illustrator, graphic designer and teacher
 Herman Ambrosius Jan Baanders (1876–1953) architect, designer and entrepreneur 
 Gonnie Baars (1947–2000)
 Ryan Babel (1986), football player
 Philip Johannes Bachiene (1814–1881)
 Henk Bakker sr. (1940–2008), politicus
 Piet Bambergen (1931–1996)
 Jan Bank (born 1940) historian and local politician
 Adnan Barakat (1982), football player
 Barbara Barend (1974)
 Frits Barend (1947), presentator
 Sonja Barend (born 1940)  TV personality and former talk show host.
 Barend Barendse (1907–1981)
 Benno Barnard (1954)
 Robbert Baruch (1967), politicus
 Sarah Bavly (1900–1993), nutrition education pioneer in Israel
 Tabe Bas (1927–2009), actor
 Kiran Bechan (1982), football player
 Sheraldo Becker (1995), football player
 Willibrord van Beek (1949) retired politician and financial adviser.
 Mary Beekman (1884–1957), actor
 Peter Beense (1963)
 Hans Beijer (1948), actor
 Daniël Belinfante (1893–1945), componist
 Frieda Belinfante (1904–1995) cellist, conductor, lesbian and resistance member
 Roy Beltman (1946–2005)
 Tamarah Benima (1950)
 Hadjar Benmiloud (1989)
 Tarek Ben Yakoub (1994)
 Carolien van den Berg (1953), actor
 Nick van den Berg (born 1980) professional pool player. 
 Chris Berger (1911–1965), athlete
 Elles Berger (1940)
 Hans van den Bergh (1932–2011)
 Harry van den Bergh (1942) politician 
 Herman van den Bergh (1897–1967)
 Robbert van den Bergh (1913–1997)
 Dennis Bergkamp (1969), football player
 Vera Bergkamp (1971), politicus
 Lobke Berkhout (1980), sailor
 Gerrit Cornelis Berkouwer (1903–1996) theologian
 Hendrik Petrus Berlage (1856–1934) architect 
 Helen Berman (1936; born as Hélène Julia Cohen) 
 Ron Berteling (born 1957) retired ice hockey player and coach.
 Jan George Bertelman (1782–1854), componist
 Hanna Bervoets (1984), writer
 Ernst van der Beugel (1918–2004) economist, businessman, diplomat and politician
 Bernard van Beurden (1933), componist
 Jan van Beveren (1948–2011) football goalkeeper and coach
 Jean Bevers (1852–1909) politician
 Agathe L. van Beverwijk (1907–1958), mycologist
 Pepijn Bierenbroodspot (1965)
 Ronny Bierman (1938–1984), actor
 Jan van den Biesen (1836–1897)
 Martine Bijl (1948–2019)
 Hendrik Bijleveld (1885–1954)
 Vincent Bijlo (1965)
 Wim Bijmoer (1914–2000)
 Willem Bilderdijk (1756–1831), writer
 Diego Biseswar (1988), football player
 Gaby Blaaser (1986)
 Jan Blaaser (1922–1988)
 Riny Blaaser (1920–2009), actor
 Adriaan Blaauw (1914–2010) astronomer.
 Wilhelmina Bladergroen (1908–1983)
 Ton Blanker (1960), football player
 Rinse Blanksma (1974)
 Michael Bleekemolen (born 1949) racing driver 
 Cor Blekemolen (1894–1972), cyclist
 Daley Blind (1990), football player
 Andries Blitz (1890–1942)
 Jordi Bloem (1976)
 Adèle Bloemendaal (1933)
 Henk Blok (1967)
 Jan Blokker (1927–2010)  journalist, writer and amateur historian.
 Meindert Boekel (1915–1989)
 Margreeth de Boer (born 1939) politician and Mayor of Leeuwarden. 2001-2004
 Piet de Boer (1919–1984), football player
 Sacha de Boer (1967) photographer, presenter and former journalist.
 Saar Boerlage (1932)
 Femke Boersma (1935), actor
 Gé Bohlander (1895–1940) & Willy Bohlander (1891–1939) water polo players
 Daniël Boissevain (1969), actor
 Walrave Boissevain (1876–1944), politicus
 Wilson Boldewijn (1975)
 Frits Bolkestein (born 1933) retired politician and businessman 
 Jan Bomans (1885–1941), politicus
 Vic Bonke (born 1940) politician 
 Rik van den Boog (born 1959) football manager and former player.
 Lennart Booij (1970)
 Els Borst (1932–2014), government minister
 Piet Borst (born 1934) professor of clinical biochemistry and molecular biology
 Annie Bos (1886–1875), actor
 Bart Bosch (1963)
 Jeronimo de Bosch Kemper (1808–1876)
 Pieter Philip van Bosse (1809–1879) politician
 Carlo Boszhard (born 1969) TV personality, singer, impersonator and host.
 Ron Boszhard (born 1963) TV presenter. 
 Jan Bouman (1706–1776)
 Mbark Boussoufa (1984), football player
 Bob Bonte (1929–1988), swimmer
 Ferdinand Bordewijk (1884–1965), writer
 Hans Boswinkel (1935–1999)
 Froukje de Both (1972), actor
 Ina Boudier-Bakker (1875–1966) 
 Esaias Boursse (1631–1672) painter. 
 Dries Boussatta (1972), football player
 Henk Bouwman (1926–1995)
 Mies Bouwman (1929-2018) TV presenter.
 Mohammed Bouyeri (born 1978) murdered Dutch film director Theo van Gogh.
 Marian Boyer (1954)
 Nouchka van Brakel (born 1940) film director
 Rick Brandsteder (1984)
 Ron Brandsteder (1950)
 Jan Brasser (1912–1999), athlete
 Gerbrand Bredero (1585–1618), poet and playwright
 Esmée de la Bretonière (1973), actor
 Willem Breuker (1944–2010) composer, arranger, saxophonist and clarinetist.
 Mink Bridié (1999), TV personality
 Karim Bridji (1981), football player
 Bernhard Egidius Konrad ten Brink (1841–1892) German philologist.
 Ellis van den Brink (1947), actor
 Robert ten Brink (born 1955) TV presenter.
 Isabelle Brinkman (1972)
  (1886–1946) 
 Jan Broekhuis (1901–1973)
 Jan Broeksz (1906–1980)
 Cor Brom (1932–2008), football player and football trainer
 Ellie van den Brom (1949) retired speed skater
 Harry Bronk (1922–1996)
 Sasja Brouwers (1972)
 Frans Brüggen (1934–2014) conductor, recorder player and baroque flautist.
 Koert-Jan de Bruijn (1976)
 Tina de Bruin (born 1975) actress
 Tonny Bruins Slot (1947), football trainer
 Klaas Bruinsma (1953–1991) drug lord.
 Joost Buitenweg (1967), actor
 Jack Bulterman (1909–1977)
 Johannes Burman (1706–1779) botanist and physician.
 Pieter Burman the Younger (1713–1778), philologist.
 Ann Burton (1933–1989) jazz singer.
 Kees Buurman (1936–2007)
 Cor du Buy (1921–2011)

C 

 Maup Caransa (1916–2009) businessman and real-estate developer
 David de Jahacob Lopez Cardozo (1808–1890), Talmudist 
 Mirano Carrilho (1975), football player
 Charlene de Carvalho-Heineken (born 1954) billionaire businesswoman, owns 25% of Heineken N.V. 
 Henk ten Cate (1954), football player and football trainer
 Leontien Ceulemans (1952)
 Mohammed Chaara (1980), actor
 Sarah Chronis (1986), actor
 Gerard George Clifford (1779–1847)
 Frans Coenen (1866–1936), writer
 René van Collem (1961)
 Simon van Collem (1919–1989)
 Charles van Commenée (born 1958) athletics coach.
 Karina Content (born 1960) writer and politician 
 Dirck Coornhert (1522–1590), writer, philosopher, politician, theologian and artist.
 Athanase Josué Coquerel (1820–1875) French Protestant theologian.
 Rita Corita (1917–1998)
 Paulien Cornelisse (1976)
 Hans Cornelissen (1956), actor
 Uri Coronel (1946-2016), sports director (AFC Ajax)
 Isaäc da Costa (1798–1860) a Jewish poet.
 Cor Coster (1920–2008)
 Wessel Couzijn (1912–1984)
 Ben Cramer (1947; born as Kramer), singer and actor
 Jacqueline Cramer (born 1951) politician and biologist.
 Hans Croiset (1935)
 Manja Croiset 1946 Dutch Author 
 Vincent Croiset (1972), actor
 Estelle Cruijff (1978)
 Johan Cruijff (1947-2016), football player and football trainer
 Paul Crutzen (1933-2021) meteorologist and atmospheric chemist.

D 

 Dyron Daal (1983), football player
 Tatum Dagelet (1975)
 Johannes van Dam (1946) journalist, writer on food
 Nicolette van Dam (born 1984) actress, model and TV host.
 Elly Dammers (1921–2009), athlete
 Rudi van Dantzig (1933–2012) choreographer, company director, and writer.
 Hans Daudt (1925–2008)
 Sanny Day (1921–2008)
 Louis Debij (1937)
 Sir Matthew Decker, 1st Baronet (1679–1749) merchant and economist. 
 Eduard Douwes Dekker (1820–1887), writer, pen name, Multatuli. 
 Thomas Dekker (1984), cyclist
 Lex van Delden (1947–2010), actor
 Dikke Dennis (1965)
 Thierry Detant (1965), Olympic cyclist
 Joep van Deudekom (1960)
 Boy Deul (1987), football player
 Frans van Deursen (1962)
 Ineke Dezentjé Hamming-Bluemink (1954) former politician. 
 Isaäc Nicolaas Theodoor Diepenhorst (1907–1976)
 Ko van Dijk Jr. (1916–1978)
 Gé van Dijk (1923–2005), football player
 Nova van Dijk (1976)
 Guus Dijkhuizen (1937–2013)
 Lore Dijkman (1984), actor
 Nico Dijkshoorn (born 1960) author, columnist, blogger, poet and musician.
 Loek Dikker (born 1944) pianist, conductor and composer
 Michael Dingsdag (1982), football player
 Dio (1988)
 Charles Dissels (1984), football player
 Tijn Docter (1972), actor
 Bram de Does (1934-2015) graphic and type designer.
 Ferdinand Domela Nieuwenhuis (1846–1919), politicus
 Luciano Dompig (1987), football player
 Mitchell Donald (1988), football player
 Peter van Dongen (born 1966) cartoonist. 
 Ryan Donk (1986), football player
 Piet Hein Donner (1948), politicus
 Agaath Doorgeest (1914–1991), athlete
 Tamar van den Dop (1970)
 Steve van Dorpel (1965–1989), football player
 Eduard Douwes Dekker (1820–1887), writer
 Sjoerd Dragtsma (1984), actor
 Nanette Drazic (1980)
 Willem Drees sr. (1886–1988) politician and Prime Minister of the Netherlands 1948-1958.
 Anton Dreesmann (1923–2000)
 Richard Dreise (1969)
 Danny Drenth (1963)
 Dana van Dreven (1974) gabber DJ and producer.
 Nick Driebergen (1987), swimmer
 Kees Driehuis (1951–2019), journalist and TV host
 Leo Driessen (1955)
 Aarnout Drost (1810–1834)
 Hendrik Lodewijk Drucker (1857–1917), politicus
 Wilhelmina Drucker (1847–1925) politician, writer and early feminist
 Pierre H. Dubois (1917–1999) writer and critic.
 Willem Dudok (1884–1974) modernist architect. 
 Hans Dulfer (born 1940) tenor saxophone jazz musician
 Inez van Dullemen (1925 -2021)
 Frans van Dusschoten (1933–2005)
 Anthony Ernst Mary Duynstee (1920)
 Jeroen Duyster (1966), coxswain, Olympic gold medallist
 Linda van Dyck (1948; born as Linda de Hartogh), actor

E 

 Cor Eberhard (1947) former politician.
 Boy Edgar (1915–1980) jazz conductor, pianist and trumpeter.
 Jesse Edwards (2000), college basketball player for the Syracuse Orange
 Gerbrand van den Eeckhout (1621–1674) painter.
 Esmée van Eeghen (1918–1944), resistance fighter in World War II
 Klaas van der Eerden (1975)
 Erick van Egeraat (1956), architect
 Remco van Eijden born (1977) former darts player.
 Joop Eijl (1896–1941)
 Maya Eksteen (1958)
 Soundos El Ahmadi (1981)
 Ger van Elk (1941-2014) created sculptures and painted photographs.
 Ferdi Elmas (1985), football player
 Johan Elsensohn (1884–1966)
 Harry Elte (1880–1944) architect.
 Urby Emanuelson (1986), football player
 Caro Emerald (born 1981) pop and jazz singer 
 Stephen Emmer (born 1958), composer, arranger, producer and musician.
 Herman Emmink (1927–2013)
 Joop van den Ende (born 1942) theatrical producer
 Rick Engelkes (1959)
 Martin van Engelshoven-Huls (1964)
 Jan van Ens (1620–1652)
 Simon Episcopius (1583–1643) a theologian and Remonstrant. 
 Angela Esajas (1978)
 Malcolm Esajas (1986), football player
 Rudolf Escher (1912–1980), composer and music theorist.
 Max Euwe (1901–1981), chess player and mathematician
 Bloeme Evers-Emden (1926–2016), teacher, child psychologist and Holocaust survivor

F 

 Henri Faas (1926–1990)
 Ina van Faassen (1928–2011) actress and comedian.
 Raymond Fafiani (1983), football player
 Rik Felderhof (1948)
 Gino Felixdaal (1990), football player
 Ruud Feltkamp (1989), actor
 Kees Fens (1929–2008) writer, essayist and literary critic.
 Hubert Fermin (1948), actor
 Ad Fernhout (1946)
 Dirk Filarski (1885–1964)
 Barthold Fles (1902–1989), literary agent
 George Fles (1908–1939), translator and victim of Stalin's Great Purge
 Melvin Fleur (1982), football player
 Coen Flink (1932–2000)
 Joss Flühr (1940), actor
 Cornelis Fock (1828–1910)
 Stella Fontaine (1889–1966)
 Jan Fontijn (1936)
 Theo Fransman (1928–2007)
 Lange Frans (1980) rapper and TV presenter.
 Herman Frijda (1887–1944)
 Nelly Frijda (1936), actor
 Johan Frinsel sr. (1927)
 Jan Froger ("Bolle Jan")
 René Froger (1960), singer
 Laura Fygi (born 1955) jazz and pop singer

G 

 Louis van Gaal (1951), football trainer
 Tess Gaerthé (1991) singer and former child star.
 Bert Garthoff (1913–1997)
 Jimmy Geduld (1964), actor
 Jacob Geel (1789–1862) scholar, critic and librarian.
 Jacobine Geel (1963)
 Jan Willem Gefken (1807–1887)
 Annemarie van Gelder (1955)
 Han van Gelder (1923–2012)
 Jack van Gelder (born 1950) sport commentator and TV presenter
 Tygo Gernandt (1974), actor
 Winston Gerschtanowitz (1976) presenter and actor.
 Kick Geudeker (1901–1977), football player and sports journalist
 Thorvald de Geus (1964)
 Jan van Gilse (1843–1915), politicus
 Jaap Glasz (1935–2005)
 Michel Henry Godefroi (1830–1882)
 Frans Goedhart (1904–1990) journalist, politician and resistance member
 Sim Gokkes (1897–1943), composer
 Jip Golsteijn (1945–2002)
 Niels Gomperts (1991), actor
 Leo van der Goot (1950)
 Mylène Gordinou (1972)
 Gordon (1968)
 Henk Gortzak (1908–1989)
 Carel Goseling (1891–1941) lawyer and politician 
 Jasper Gottlieb (1989), actor
 Marius Gottlieb (1989), actor
 Jetta Goudal (1891–1985), actor
 Anneke Goudsmit (1933), politicus
 Manfred de Graaf (1939), actor
 Thom de Graaf (born 1957) politician and jurist
 Anton P. de Graaff (1928–2008), writer
 Cynthia de Graaff (1975)
 Agneta de Graeff van Polsbroek (1603–1656), mother of Wendela Bicker and mother in law of Johan de Witt, Grand Pensionary of Holland
 Andries de Graeff (1611-1678), Amsterdam burgomaster and regent, statesman; uncle of Johan de Witt
 Cornelis de Graeff (1599-1664), Amsterdam burgomaster and regent, statesman, Diplomat; uncle of Johan de Witt
 Dirck Jansz Graeff (1532-1589), Amsterdam burgomaster
 Dirk de Graeff van Polsbroek (1833-1916), diplomat in Japan 
 Jacob Dircksz de Graeff (1570-1638), Amsterdam burgomaster and regent, statesman
 Lenaert Jansz de Graeff (around 1525/30-before 1578)  one of the leaders of the Protestant Reformation in Amsterdam, captain of the Sea Beggars
 Pieter de Graeff (1638-1707), Amsterdam patrician, politician; brother-in-law of Johan de Witt 
 Glennis Grace (born 1978) singer
 Metta Gramberg (1959), actor
 Frank de Grave (1955) politician and businessman
 Serginho Greene (1982), football player
 Didi Gregorius (1990), baseball shortstop
 Aus Greidanus sr. (1950)
 Annemarie Grewel (1935–1998) senator, educator and columnist. 
 Fred Grim (1965), football player (goalkeeper)
 Germaine Groenier (1943–2007)
 Gijs Groenteman (1974)
 Hanneke Groenteman (born 1939) journalist, radio broadcaster and TV presenter
 Paul van Groningen (1955)
 Ferry de Groot (1948)
 Harry de Groot (1920–2004)
 Jan de Groot (1948)
 Jim de Groot (1972)
 Paul de Groot (1899–1986), politicus
 Frank Groothof (1947), actor
 Amy Groskamp-ten Have (1887–1956)
 Robert Jasper Grootveld (1932–2009) artist
 Hans Grosheide (1930), politicus
 Ruud Gullit (1962), football player
 Henk Guth (1921–2002), artist

H 

 Meijer de Haan (1852–1895) painter.
 Bobby Haarms (1934–2009), football player and football trainer
 Cox Habbema (born 1944-2016) film and TV actress.
 Eddy Habbema (1947)
 Aart Hendrik Willem Hacke (1893–1961), politicus
 Had-je-me-maar (1856–1931; real name: Cornelis de Gelder)
 Paul Haenen (born 1946) comedian and voice actor.
 Bernard Haitink (1929-2021) conductor and violinist. 
 Henri Halberstadt (1917–1943)
 Alex van Halen (1953) American musician and drummer
 Edward Lodewijk (Eddy) van Halen (1955-2020) American musician and guitar player
 Floris Adriaan van Hall (1791–1866)
 Gijs van Hall (1904–1977) banker, resistance member and Mayor of Amsterdam, 1957-1967.
 Walraven van Hall (1906–1945) banker and resistance leader 
 Fernando Halman (1981)
 Frans Halsema (1939–1984)
 Boris van der Ham (1973), politicus
 Hartog Hamburger (1887–1924) diamond polisher and baseball player.
 Jacob Hamel (1883–1943)
 Jules Hamel (1938), actor
 Mariëtte Hamer (1958), politicus
 Simon Hammelburg (1952), entertainer, songwriter, author and journalist
 Otto Hanrath (1882–1944) painter.
 Tol Hansse (1940–2002; real name: Hans van Tol) 
 Annick van Hardeveld (1923–1945)
 Johannes Martinus van Hardeveld (1891–1953)
 Badr Hari (born 1984) kickboxer
 Cor van der Hart (1928–2006), football player and football trainer
 Rob Hartoch (1947–2009), chess master
 Abraham Frans Karel Hartogh (1844–1901), politicus
 Jan Frederik Hartsuiker (1913–2003)
 Maryam Hassouni (1985), actor
 Boy Hayje (1949), Formule 1 driver
 André Hazes (1951–2004) singer and actor. 
 Maaike Head (1983), rower
 Jan Heemskerk (1818–1897), politicus
 Jan Heemskerk Bzn. (1811–1880)
 Johan van Heemskerk (1597–1656), poet.
 Theo Heemskerk (1852–1932) politician, Prime Minister of the Netherlands 1908-1913.
 Simon Heere Heeresma (1932–2011) author and poet.
 Pieter Heerma (1977), politicus
 Freddy Heineken (1923–2002) businessman 
 Pascal Heije (1979), football player
 Sanne Heijen (1981)
 Jérôme Louis Heldring (1917–2013) journalist, columnist and editor 
 Bernardus Hermanus Heldt (1841–1914)
 Sergio Hellings (1984), football player
 Jan Frederik Helmers (1767–1813), poet.
 Pamela Hemelrijk (1947–2009), journalist
 Henk Hemsing (1891–1971) Olympic diver
 Maurits Hendriks (born 1961) field hockey goalkeeper and coach
 Ruud Hendriks (1959)
 Marpessa Hennink (1964), former model
 Truus Hennipman (1943), athlete
 Katja Herbers (1980), actor
 Eric Herfst (1937–1985)
 Willem Frederik Hermans (1921–1995) author of poetry, novels, short stories, plays, 
 Cor Hermus (1889–1953)
 Guus Hermus (1918–2001), actor
 Herman Hertzberger (1932), architect
 Abel Herzberg (1893–1989) lawyer and writer
 Judith Herzberg (born 1934) poet and writer.
 Danny Hesp (1969), football player
 Catharina Hesterman (1902–1982) Olympic diver
 Jan Hesterman (1893–1963) & Wim Hesterman (1897–1971) Olympic boxers
 Jan Bertus Heukelom (1875–1965)
 Arturo ten Heuvel (1978), football player
 John van den Heuvel (born 1962) crime journalist, TV presenter and former police officer.
 Wim van den Heuvel (1928), actor
 Sara Heyblom (1892–1990), actor
 Christianus Joannes Antonius Heydenrijck (1832–1911)
 Ernst Hijmans (1890–1987)
 Ernst Hirsch Ballin (born 1950) retired politician and jurist
 Henk Hoekstra (1924–2009) politician 
 Pieter van der Hoeven (1911–1980)
 Henk Hofstra (1904–1999)
 Carl Hollander (1934–1995)
 Willem Holleeder (born 1958) criminal and kidnapper
 Theodor Holman (1953), writer
 Marc de Hond (1977-2020) TV presenter, businessman, writer and theatre performer, 
 Maurice de Hond (born 1947) pollster and entrepreneur.
 Harmanus Hondius (1903–1996)
 Pieter Corneliszoon Hooft (1581–1647) historian, poet and playwright. 
 Micky Hoogendijk (born 1970) actress, presenter, model and photographer.
 Martin Hoogland (1956–2004)
 Albert van der Hoogte (1909–1970), writer
 Jaap de Hoop Scheffer (born 1948) politician, diplomat and lawyer 
 Netty van Hoorn (born 1951) film director and producer 
 Henk van der Horst (1939)
 Dilara Horuz (1994)
 Bas van Hout (1959)
 Cor van Hout (1957–2003) criminal and kidnapper 
 Xander Houtkoop (1989), football player
 Kees Houtman (1959–2005)
 Johannes Petrus Huibers (1875–1969)
 Pieter Huidekoper (1798–1852)
 Hellen Huisman (1937–2012) voice actor
 Micha Hulshof (1979), actor
 Ben Hulsman (1931), actor
 Gerard van Hulst (1909–1990)
 Johan van Hulst (1911-2018) university professor, author, politician, chess player and centenarian.
 Kees Hulst (1952)
 Donny Huysen (1973), football player
 Jan van Huysum (1682–1749) painter.
 Ernst Hijmans (1890–1987)

I 

 Boudewijn Ietswaart (1936-2010), graphic designer
 Piet Ikelaar (1896–1992), cyclist
 Jeanne Immink (1853–1929), mountaineer
 Rinus Israël (1942), football player and football trainer

J 

 Binyomin Jacobs (1949) rabbi
 Martine Jacobs (1956), artist
 Dieter Jansen (1969)
 Dolf Jansen (born 1963) comedian
 Hans Jansen (1942) politician, scholar of contemporary Islam and author.
 Harrie Jansen (1947), cyclist
 Huub Jansen (1928–1985) 
 Lou Jansen (1900–1943)
 Martinus Jansen (1905–1983)
 Wim Jansen (docent) (1948)
 Famke Janssen (1964), actor
 Cornelis Janssens (1593–1661) English portrait painter. 
 Julius Jaspers (1962)
 Daan Jippes (1945), cartoonist (comic books)
 Virgall Joemankhan (1968–1989), football player
 Jolle Albertus Jolles (1814–1882), politicus
 John Jones (1963), actor
 Jacques de Jong (1930–1991)
 Jasperina de Jong (1938)
 Jennifer de Jong (1976)
 Loe de Jong (1914–2005) historian
 Nigel de Jong (1984), football player
 Trudy de Jong (1948), actor
 Calvin Jong-A-Pin (1986), football player
 Jan Jongbloed (1940), football player (goalkeeper)
 Leen Jongewaard (1927–1996), actor and singer
 Wik Jongsma (1943–2008), actor
 Andries Jonker (1962), football coach
 Johnny Jordaan (1924–1989) singer of popular music

K 

 Johan Kaart (1897–1976), actor
 Jaap Kaas (1898–1972)
 René Kahn (born 1954) neuropsychiatrist 
 Edna Kalb (1959)
 Abraham van Karnebeek (1836–1925)
 Ton Kas (1959)
 Isaäc Keesing Jr. (1886–1966)
 Leo Keesing (1912–1997)
 Piet Keizer (1943), football player
 Sander Keller (1979), football player
 Jos van Kemenade (born 1937) politician
 Jacobus Mattheüs de Kempenaer (1793–1870) politician and lawyer
 Joan Melchior Kemper (1776–1824), politicus
 Wytske Kenemans (1980)
 Arie Keppler (1876–1941)
 Michiel Kerbosch (1947), actor
 Hendrik Kerstens (1956), photographer, visual artist
 Theodore Matthieu Ketelaar (1864–1936), politician
 Otto Ketting (1935–2012), componist
 Teun van de Keuken (1971), journalist, novelist
 Thomas de Keyser (ca.1596–1667) portrait painter.
 Dunya Khayame (1981), actor
 Wim Kieft (1962), football player
 Pelle Kil (1971), Olympic cyclist
 Sharon Kips (born 1983) singer
 Dominique Kivuvu (1987), football player
 Karel Klaver (1978), hockey player
 Joram van Klaveren (1979), politicus
 Gerrit Kleerekoper (1897–1943) gymnastics coach and a diamond cutter.
 Aart Klein (1909–2001) photographer
 Hetty Kleinloog (1958)
 Simone Kleinsma (1958) musical theatre actress 
 Monique Klemann (1965)
 Suzanne Klemann (1963)
 Sam Klepper (1960–2000)
 Michel de Klerk (1884–1923) architect.
 Mientje Kling (1894–1966) theatre and film actress and radio personality.
 Dolf Kloek (1916–2012), writer
 André Kloos (1922–1989)
 Oger Klos (1993), football player
 Jacques Klöters (1946)
 Patrick Kluivert (1976), football player
 Gerrie Knetemann (1951–2004), cyclist
 Rie Knipscheer (1911–2003) artist.
 Koen Koch (1945–2012)
 Milano Koenders (1986), football player
 Adriaen Koerbagh (1633–1669)
 Hermann Friedrich Kohlbrugge (1803–1875) minister and reformed theologian
 Dolph Kohnstamm (1937)
 Max Kohnstamm (1914–2010) historian and diplomat.
 Ada Kok (1947), swimmer
 Mimi Kok (1934-2014)  film and television actress.
 Edward Koldewijn (1964), actor
 Han König (1911–1964)
 Philip de Koninck (1619–1688) landscape painter. 
 Henk Koning (1934–2009), football player
 Sabine Koning (1973), actor
 Betje Koolhaas (1972), actor
 Frans Koppers (1932–2010), actor
 John Körmeling (1951)
 Herman Kortekaas (1930)
 Frits Korthals Altes (1931), politicus
 Pim Korver (1937–2012)
 Guuske Kotte (1947)
 Gerrit Kouwenaar (1923-2014) journalist, translator, poet and prose writer.
 John Kraaijkamp (1925–2011) actor, comedian and singer. 
 Johnny Kraaijkamp (1954), actor
 Diederik Kraaijpoel (1928–2012)
 Jasper Krabbé (1970)
 Jeroen Krabbé (born 1944) actor and film director
 Martijn Krabbé (1968), presentator
 Mirko Krabbé (1960)
 Tim Krabbé (1943), writer
 Piet Kramer (1881–1961), architect
 Arnost Kraus (1973)
 Michel Kreek (1971), football player
 Lona Kroese (1987), swimmer
 Ruud Krol (1949), football player and football coach
 Ron Kroon (1942–2000), swimmer
 Karel Wendel Kruijswijk (1921)
 Willy Kruyt (1877–1943) Protestant minister and politician.
 Guus Kuijer (1942), writer
 André Kuipers (1958)

L 

 Pernille La Lau (1971)
 Yvette Laclé (born 1955) local politician and a reformed prostitute and drug addict
 Maroesja Lacunes (1945)
 Frits Lambrechts (born 1937) actor, musician and cabaret artist.
 Jan Joris Lamers (1942)
 Michael Lamey (1979), football player
 Esmé Lammers (1958)
 Kim Lammers (1981), hockey player
 Denny Landzaat (1976), football player
 Lucie de Lange (1957; also known as Lucie Janine Michielsen)
 Arend Langenberg (1949–2012)  voice-over, voice actor and radio presenter.
 Henk Lankhorst (1914–1976), politicus
 Nicolaas Lansdorp (1885–1968)
 L.A. Raeven (born 1971) arts duo
 Saskia Laroo (born 1959) jazz musician
 Petra Laseur (1939), actor
 Herman Lauxtermann (1929–1999)
 Chris Lebeau (1878–1945)
 Thijs van Leer (born 1948) musician, singer, songwriter, composer and producer
 Jean Leering (1934–2005)
 Reinbert de Leeuw (1938–) conductor, pianist and composer.
 Nani Lehnhausen (1975), actor
 Cornelis Lely (1854–1929) politician and civil engineer.
 Gerard van der Lem (1952), football player and football coach
 Jacob van Lennep (1802–1868) poet and novelist.
 Jeremain Lens (1987), football player
 Trudy Libosan (1940)
 Jan Ligthart (1859–1916) teacher and philosopher.
 Wibo van de Linde (1938)
 Hiske van der Linden (1954), actor
 Patricia Linhard (1957), politicus
 Dana Lixenberg (born 1964) photographer and filmmaker.
 Guillaume Lo A Njoe (1937)
 David Jessurun Lobo (1884–1926)
 Frank Lodeizen (1931–2013)
 Rifka Lodeizen (1972), actor
 Theo Loevendie (born 1930) composer and clarinet player.
 Dick Loggere (1921), hockey player
 Joghem van Loghem (1914–2005) professor of internal medicine
 Lot Lohr (1963), actor
 Tyrone Loran (1981), football player
 Fajah Lourens (1981), actor
 Victor Löw (1962; born as Victor Arthur Löwenstein), actor
 Tom Löwenthal (1954)
 Huub van der Lubbe (1953), singer and actor
 Reinier Lucassen (1939)
 Eric Lucassen (1974), politicus
 Lucebert (1924–1994) artist and poet of the COBRA (art movement)
 Marjan Luif (1947)
 Gijs Luirink (1983), football player
 Oger Lusink (1947)
 Charly Luske (1978), singer and actor
 Marion Lutke (1958)
 Joris Luyendijk (1971), journalist

M 

 Maarten Maartens (1858–1915), writer
 Nol Maassen (1922–2009) politician
 Calvin Mac-Intosch (1989), football player
 Sherjill MacDonald (1984), football player
 Angelo Martha (1982), football player
 Bentinho Massaro (born 1988/1989), online New Age guru and alleged cult founder
 Clous van Mechelen (1942; real name: Jack Phillip van Mechelen) 
 Eduard Meijer (1878–1929), swimmer
 Ischa Meijer (1943–1995) journalist, TV & radio resenter, critic and author. 
 Jan Meijer (1921–1993), athlete
 Johnny Meijer (1912–1992) accordionist who played classical, folk, and swing.
 Mario Melchiot (1976), football player
 Joseph Mendes da Costa (1863–1939) sculptor and teacher.
 Hursut Meric (1983), football player
 Jan Messchert van Vollenhoven (1812–1881)
 Edward Metgod (1959), football player (goalkeeper) and football trainer
 John Metgod (1958), football player and football trainer
 Frits Meuring (1882–1973), Olympic freestyle swimmer 
 Lodewijk Meyer (1629–1681)  physician, classical scholar, lexicographer and playwright.
 Rinus Michels (1928–2005), football player and football trainer
 John Mieremet (1960–2005) underworld figure associated with extortion and assassination.
Lion van Minden (1880–1944), Olympic fencer who was killed in the Auschwitz concentration camp
 Albert Mol (1917–2004), actor
 Frans Molenaar (1940–2015) 
 Michael Mols (1970), football player
 Rik Moorman (1961), cyclist
 Ibad Muhamadu (1982), football player
 Paul Mulders (1981), football player
Bennie Muller (born 1938), footballer player
 Robin Muller van Moppes (1984), football player
 Danny de Munk (born 1970) actor, singer, musical actor and former child star.

N 

 Jan Coenraad Nachenius (1890–1987)
 Jan Nagel (born 1939) politician
 Karel Nagel (1934–1979)
 Piet Nak (1906–1996)
 Guusje Nederhorst (1969–2004) actress and singer.
 Aert van der Neer (ca.1603–1677) landscape painter.
 Eglon van der Neer (ca.1635–1703) painter.
 Gregory Nelson (1988), football player
 Helma Neppérus (born 1950) politician, former tax inspector and rower.
 Anouk van Nes (1971)
 Nada van Nie (1967)
 Daan Nieber (born 1980)  journalist
 Ivo Niehe (born 1946) radio and TV presenter, TV producer and actor.
 Ed Nieman (1961)
 Rick Nieman (1965)
 Constant Nieuwenhuijs (1920–2005)
 Matthijs van Nieuwkerk (born 1960) journalist and TV presenter. 
 Loudi Nijhoff (1900–1995), actor
 Rob de Nijs (1942), singer and actor
 Louis Noiret (1896–1968)
 Piet Nolting (1852–1923), politicus
 Beppie Nooij Jr. (1919–1979)
 Beppie Nooij Sr. (1893–1976)
 Reinier Nooms (1623–1688) maritime painter
 Bob Noorda (1927–2010) graphic designer, worked in Milan
 Saskia Noorman-den Uyl (1946) former politician
 Lea Nordheim (1903–1943), gymnast
 Joost Nuissl (1945)

O 

Simon Okker (1881–1944), Olympic fencer killed in the Auschwitz concentration camp
 Tom Okker (born 1944), tennis player; world # 3 
 Jacob Olie (1834–1905) photographer
 Sam Olij (1900–1975) Olympic heavyweight boxer
 Janus Ooms (1866–1924), rower
 Piet Ooms (1884–1961), swimmer
 Huub Oosterhuis (born 1933) theologian and poet. 
 Tjeerd Oosterhuis (born 1971) musician, songwriter and producer
 Trijntje Oosterhuis (born 1973) singer and songwriter. 
 André Ooijer (1974), football player
 Rogier van Otterloo (1941–1988) composer and conductor.
 Gonny van Oudenallen (born 1957) Creative Director, former politician
 Rob Oudkerk (born 1955) politician and general practitioner. 
 Alistair Overeem (1980) MMA Fighter

P 

 Max Pam (born 1946) Australian photographer.
 Ans Panhorst-Niesink (1918–2010), Olympics discus thrower
 David Pardo, 17th century rabbi
 Ted van der Parre (born 1955) former strongman 
 Arie Passchier
 Robert Paul (1949), entertainer and imitator
 Pieter Pauw (1564–1617)  botanist and anatomist.
 Vera Pauw (1963), football player and football coach
 Marcel Peeper (1965), football player
 Elja Pelgrom (1951–1995), actor
 Jaap Penraat (1918–2006) resistance fighter during the Second World War
 Martin Perels (1960–2005), actor (Q & Q)
 Lily Petersen (1913–2004)
 Ankie Peypers (1928–2008)
 Peter Piekos (1918–2000) voice actor.
 Cindy Pielstroom (1970)
 Johanna Pieneman (1889–1986) artist.
 Nicolaas Pierson (1839–1909)
 Eddy Pieters Graafland (1934), football player (goalkeeper)
 Heleen Pimentel (1916–2008), actor
 Menachem Pinkhof (1920–1969)
 Benjamin Pinto (1980), football player
 Mitchell Piqué (1979), football player
 Henk Pleket (1937–2011), singer (de Havenzangers)
 Glynor Plet (1987), football player
 Hans Plomp (1944)
 Jack Plooij (1961)
 Eddy Poelmann (1950)
 Rydell Poepon (1987), football player
 Frans Pointl (1933), writer
 Andrea van Pol (1962)
 Clairy Polak (1956)
 Henri Polak (1868–1943) trade unionist and politician.
 Willem Polak (1915)
 Wim Polak (1924–1999) politician
 Johan Polet (1894–1971)
 Willem Gerrit van de Poll (1763–1836)
 René Ponk (1971), football player (goalkeeper)
 Sylvain Poons (1896–1985)
 Henk Poort (born 1956) actor and singer, mainly in operas and musicals.
 Ine Poppe (born 1960) artist, journalist and writer
 Peter Post (1933–2011), cyclist
 Jan Postma (1895–1944)
 Ella van Poucke (born 1994), cellist 
 Beryl van Praag (1969)
 Chiel van Praag (1949), presentator
 Jaap van Praag (1910–1987)
 Marga van Praag (born 1946)  journalist and TV presenter.
 Max van Praag (1913–1991), singer
 Michael van Praag (born 1947) football administrator and former referee.
 Benno Premsela (1920–1997) designer, visual artist and art collector.
 Gerard Prent (born 1954) a contemporary painter.
 Jacques Presser (1899–1970) historian, writer and poet.
 Anduele Pryor (1985), football player

Q 
 Paul Quasten (1985), football player
 Emanuel Querido (1871–1943) bookseller and publisher
 Israël Querido (1872–1932), writer
 Huibert Quispel (1906–1995), navy officer

R 

 Jörgen Raymann (born 1966) cabaretier, stand-up comedian, actor and presenter.
 Halina Reijn (1975), actor
 Victor Reinier (born 1963) actor
 Patricia Remak (1965) politician
 Martijn Reuser (1975), football player
 Gerard (van het) Reve (1923–2006) writer
 Karel van het Reve (1921–1999) writer, translator and literary historian on Russian literature
 Daniël de Ridder (1984), football player
 Mark Rietman (born 1960) film actor
 Maceo Rigters (1984), football player
 Frank Rijkaard (1962), football player and football coach
Johnny Roeg (1910–2003), footballer, striker for Ajax
 Dries Roelvink (1959), singer
 Edsilia Rombley (1978), singer
 Piet Römer (1928–2012), actor
 Thijs Römer (1978), actor
 Raymond de Roon (born 1952) politician
 Willem Rooseboom (1843–1920) Major General and politician.
 Florentine Rost van Tonningen (1914–2007) Nazi collaborator
 Felix Rottenberg (1957) politician
 Bryan Roy (1970), football player
 Heleen van Royen (born 1965) novelist and columnist. 
 Wim Ruska (born 1940) an Olympic judoka medallist 
 An Rutgers van der Loeff (1910–1990) writer of children's novels.

S 

 Liane Saalborn (1923–1989; born as Zaalborn), actor
 Ben Sajet (1887–1986)
 Mady Saks (1941–2006)
 Jamile Samuel (1992), athlete
 Jeffrey Sarpong (1988), football player
 Nico Schaap (1946–2009), actor
 Alexander Schabracq (1957)
 Jan Schaefer (1940–1994) politician
 Ruben Schaken (1982), football player
 Dick Scheffer (1929–1986), actor
 Jules Schelvis (1921–2016), Jewish historian and Holocaust survivor
 Danny Schenkel (1978), football player
 Peggy Jane de Schepper (1971), actor
 Elsje Scherjon (1938), actor
 Johannes Leendert Scherpenisse (1888–1966)
 Wouter Schievink (born 1963), neurosurgeon
 Anton van Schijndel (1960) politician
 Bob van Schijndel (1945)
 Francis David Schimmelpenninck (1854–1924), politicus
 Gerrit Schimmelpenninck (1794–1863) businessman and politician
 Rutger Jan Schimmelpenninck van Nijenhuis (1821–1893)
 Luud Schimmelpennink (1935), politicus
 Don Pepjin Schipper  (1980), Dutch EDM DJ
 Ivo Schöffer (1922–2012)
 Jan Schokking (1864–1941) politician and Christian minister.
 Wim Schokking (1900–1960) politician
 Bob Scholte (1902–1983), singer
 Rob Scholte (born 1958) contemporary artist.
 Gabe Scholten (1921–1997), athlete
 Judy Schomper (1956)
 Eegje Schoo (1944) politician
 Hendrik Jan Schoo (1945–2007) author, journalist and magazine editor. 
 Thomas Schoorel (born 1989) tennis player.
 Cobi Schreijer (1922–2005)
 Wim Schuijt (1909–2009)
 Duifje Schuitenvoerder (1874–1942)
 Wil Schuurman (1943) politician
 Wim Schut (1920–2006)
 Thérèse Schwartze (1851–1918) portrait painter.
  (1943)
 Will van Selst (1937–2009)
 Orlow Seunke (born 1952) director, screenwriter and producer.
 Gerson Sheotahul (1987), football player
 Hans Sibbel (1958; ook bekend als Lebbis)
 Willem Sibbelee (1918–1992)
 Jan Sierhuis (born 1928) painter
 Harry N. Sierman (1927–2007)
 Ton Sijbrands (born 1949) international draughts player
 Khalid Sinouh (born 1975) former professional football goalkeeper.
 Johan Sirag (1918–2000), actor
 Jan Six (1857–1926)
 Pieter Jacob Six (1894–1986)
 Cornelis Charles Six van Oterleek (1772–1833), politicus
 Sjaak (1985)
 Denzel Slager (1993), football player
 Carry Slee (1949)
 Philip Slier (1923–1943) typesetter 
 Marjolein Sligte (1954), actor
 Harry Slinger (1949), singer
 Bert van Slooten (1960)
 Carel Philip Sluiter (1854–1933)
 Lies Sluijters (1924–2010), athlete
 Bob Smalhout (1927-2015) physician, professor and author.
 Elie Smalhout (1889–1939)
 Floortje Smit (born 1983) singer.
 Ger Smit (1933–2012)
 Lisa Smit (1993), actor
 Els Ingeborg Smits (1944–2011), actor
 A.L. Snijders (1937), writer
 Genaro Snijders (1989), football player
 Johannes Snippendaal (1616–1670)
 Johann Snoer (1868–1936), composer and harpist
 Paul van Soest (1947), actor
 Ap Sok (1907–2004)
 Ben Sombogaart (born 1947) film and TV director.
 Haya van Someren (1926–1980) politician 
 Bob Spaak (1917–2011), sports journalist
 Karin Spaink (born 1957) journalist, writer and feminist.
 Maarten Spanjer (1952)
 Anna Speller (1984), actor
 Jan Spiering (1937–1994)
 Baruch Spinoza (1632–1677),  philosopher.
 Arno Splinter (1977), football player
 Ben Springer (1897–1960) draughts player
 Sophie van der Stap (1983), writer
 Michael Stein (1935–2009), journalist
 Thérèse Steinmetz (1933), singer and actor
 Floris Stempel (1877–1910) first chairman of football club Ajax Amsterdam.
 Ernst Stern (1926–2007) Romanian-German scenic designer 
 Joop van Stigt (1934–2011), architect
 Maren Stoffels (1988)
 Co Stompé (born 1962) former professional darts player.
 Theodoor Jan Stomps (1885–1973)
 Benno Stokvis (1901–1977)
 Frans Stoppelman (1921-2007), photographer
 Tina Strobos (1920–2012), psychiatrist and World War II resistance hero
 Devika Strooker (1963), actor
 Jan Stulen (1942)
 Louis Stuyt (1914–2000) politician
 Ko Suurhoff (1905–1967), politicus
 Jan Swammerdam (1637–1680), biologist and microscopist.
 Sjaak Swart (1938), football player
 Hans van Swol (1914–2010) tennis player.
 Joyce Sylvester (1965), politicus
 Zsolt Szabó (1961)

T 

 Max Tailleur (1909–1990)
 Max Tak (1891–1967)
 Wally Tax (1948–2004) singer and songwriter.
 Ed van Teeseling (1924)
 Carry Tefsen (1938), actor
 Joseph Teixeira de Mattos (1892–1971) watercolor painter and pastellist 
 Alfred Tepe (1840–1920), architect
 Henk Terlingen (1941–1994), presentator
 Eddy Terstall (born 1964)  movie director and screenwriter.
 Amber Teterissa (1979), actor
 Brian Tevreden (1981), football player
 Ed van Thijn (1934-2021) politician 
 Theo Thijssen (1879–1943) writer, teacher and politician.
 Raymond Thiry (1959), actor
 Frits Thors (1909-2014) journalist and news anchor. 
 Eric van Tijn (born 1956) music producer
 Jan Timman (1951), chess player
 Coby Timp (1930; born as Jacoba Toele), actor
 Herman Tjeenk Willink (born 1942) politician 
 Jeroen Tjepkema (1970)
 Willem den Toom (1928–2007)
 Waldemar Torenstra (born 1974) actor
 Anton Toscani (1901–1984) Olympic 50 km race walker.
 Karim Touzani (1980), football player
 Freddie Tratlehner (1983, Vieze Fur), rapper
 Orlando Trustfull (1970), football player
 Quinty Trustfull (born 1971)  actress, TV presenter and former model.
 Olivier Tuinier (1982), actor
 Frits van Turenhout (1913–2004) radio and TV sports journalist 
 Peter Marius Tutein Nolthenius (1814–1896), politicus

U

V 

 Fred Vaassen (1942) actor and director
 Jahrizino Valentijn (1984), football player
 Arsenio Valpoort (1992), football player
 Gerrit van der Veen (1902–1944) sculptor
 Remco van der Veen (1973)
 Nel Veerkamp (1928–2010)
 Ed Vijent (1963–2001), football player
 Marko Vejinović (1990), football player
 Adriaen van de Velde (1636-1672), painter, draughtsman and print artist.
 Willem van de Velde the Younger (1633–1707) marine painter.
 Jan van den Velden (1768–1854), politicus
 Nick van der Velden (1981), football player
 Aat Veldhoen (1934-2018) painter and graphic artist
 David Veldhoen (1957), painter
 Lau Veldt (1953), Olympic cyclist
 Gerdi Verbeet (1951) politician
 Emmy Verhey (born 1949) classical violinist.
 Paul Verhoeven (1938), film director
 Eduard Verkade (1878–1961)
 Nico Verlaan (1932) entrepreneur and politician
 Kenneth Vermeer (1986), football player (goalkeeper)
 Harry Vermeegen (1950)
 Wiet Verschure (1924–2009) city councillor
 Geoffrey Verwey (1982), football player
 Hendrik Verwoerd (1901–1966) former Prime Minister of South Africa
 Jo Vincent (1898–1989) concert soprano in oratorios, 
 Simon Vinkenoog (1928–2009), writer
 Ad Visser (1947), presentator
 André Vlaanderen (1881–1955) graphic artist
 Stefanie van Vliet (1967) politician
 Bernardus Reinierus Franciscus van Vlijmen (1843–1919) politician
 Lucretia van der Vloot (1968)
 Willem de Vlugt (1872–1945) Mayor of Amsterdam
 Wim Volkers (1899–1990) football player 
 Henk Vonhoff (1931–2010) politician
 Corry Vonk (1901–1988)
 Joop Voogd (1916–1983)
 René van Vooren (1931–1998)
 Michiel Vos (born 1970) Dutch-American journalist and US-based correspondent.
 Elles Voskes (1964), swimmer
 Jonathan Vosselman (1984), football player
 Joël Vredenburg (1866–1943)
 Frans de Vreng (1898–1974) Olympic track cyclist 
 Edwin de Vries (1950)
 Erik de Vries (1912–2004)
 Leo de Vries (1932–1994)
 James Vrij (born 1951) retired welterweight boxer 
 Coen van Vrijberghe de Coningh (1950–1997), actor
 Robert Vuijsje (1970)

W 

 Simon de Waal (born 1961) writer of TV and film scripts
 Frank Waaldijk (1965)
 Viggo Waas (1962)
 Gerard Walden (1909–2005)
 Hugo Walker (1933–2015)
 Sanne Wallis de Vries (1971)
 Wim Wama (1918–1986)
 Willie Wartaal (1982)
 Jan Baptist Weenix (1621–ca.1659) painter.
 Rogier van de Weerd (1983)
 Frans Weisz (born 1938) film director. 
 Géza Weisz (1986), actor
 Annie Wesling (1888–1956), actor
 Willem Westerman (1864–1935)
 Bas Westerweel (1963), presentator
 Willy Westerweel (1908–1999)
 Hans Wiegel (1941), politician
 Gregory van der Wiel (1988), football player
 Elsje de Wijn (1944), actor
 Juliëtte de Wijn (1962)
 Nicolaas Wijnberg (1918–2006)
 David Wijnkoop (1876–1941), politicus
 Joseph Wijnkoop (1842–1910) rabbi and scholar in Jewish studies.
 Marianne van Wijnkoop (1945)
 Harry Wijnschenk (born 1964) politician 
 Wimie Wilhelm (1961), actor
 Paul Wilking (1924–2005; beter bekend als Pistolen Paultje)
 Hans van Willigenburg (1942), presentator
 Jan Wilmans (1914–2005), politicus
 Lies de Wind (1920–2002), actor
 Sophie van Winden (1983), actor
 Anja Winter (1956)
 Ernst Witkamp (1854–1987), painter
 Cor Witschge (1925–1991)
 Rob Witschge (1966), football player
 Richard Witschge (1969), football player
 Miljuschka Witzenhausen (born 1985) model and actress.
 Pieter de Wolff (1911–2000)
 Gerrit Jan Wolffensperger (1944), politicus
 Loes Wouterson (1963)
 Christine Wttewaall van Stoetwegen (1901–1986), politicus

Y 

 Yes-R (born 1986) stage name of Yesser Roshdy, rapper and TV presenter.

Z 

 Rowin van Zaanen (1984), football player
 Philip Van Zandt (1904–1958), actor
 Michel Zanoli (1968), Olympic cyclist
 Género Zeefuik (1990), football player
 Marvin Zeegelaar (1990), football player
 Loes de Zeeuw-Lases (1947), politicus
 Bart Zeilstra (1982), singer
 Valerio Zeno (1984)
 Anne Zernike (1887–1972) liberal theologian
 Elisabeth Zernike (1891–1982)
 Frits Zernike (1888–1966) physicist and winner of the Nobel Prize in Physics in 1953 
 Emmelie Zipson (1977)
 Jo Zwaan (1922–2012), sprinter. 
 Erik de Zwart (born 1957) radio and TV maker and former D.J.
 Zwarte Riek (1924; real name: Rika Jansen)
 Theodorus Zwartkruis (1909–1983)
 Jaap van Zweden (born 1960) classical conductor and violinist.
 Ron Zwerver (born 1967) retired volleyball player

Born somewhere else 
These people were not born or adopted in Amsterdam but are or were well known for living there.

A 
 Thomas Acda (born 1967), singer, actor and comedian
 Karin Adelmund (1949–2005), politician
 Najib Amhali (born 1971), stand-up comedian and actor.
 Hedy d'Ancona (born 1937), politician
 Khadija Arib (born 1960), politician

B 

 Sabine Beens (1982), actor
 Judith Belinfante (1943), politicus
 Abdelkader Benali (1975), writer
 Jody Bernal (1981), singer
 Annette Birschel (1960)
 Fanny Blankers-Koen (1918–2004), athlete
 Esther de Boer-van Rijk (1853–1937), actor
 Ferdinand Bol (1616–1680) painter, etcher and draftsman
 Chris Bolczek (1948)
 Arie Boomsma (1974)
 Wouter Bos (born 1963) politician
 Martin Bosma (1964), politicus
 Majoor Bosshardt (1913–2007) officer in The Salvation Army
 Aaf Bouber (1885–1974), actor
 Samira Bouchibti (1970)
 Annelieke Bouwers (1976)
 Brace (1986), singer
 Patty Brard (born 1955) TV personality and a singer
 George Hendrik Breitner (1857–1923) painter and photographer. 
 Martin Bril (1959–2009)
 Frederik Brom (1975)
 Herman Brood (1946–2001) musician, painter, actor and poet.
 Martin Brozius (1941–2009) actor, presenter and comedian.
 Inge de Bruijn (1973), swimmer
 Boudewijn Büch (1948–2002), writer, poet and television presenter.

C 
 Remco Campert (born 1929) author, poet and columnist.
 Simon Carmiggelt (1913–1987) writer, journalist, and poet
 Rob Chrispijn (1944)
 Jan de Cler (1915–2009)
 Job Cohen (1947) retired Dutch politician, Mayor of Amsterdam, 2001 to 2010
 Arthur Conley (1946–2003) American soul singer
 Jules Croiset (1937), actor

D 

 Koos Dalstra (1950)
 Josine van Dalsum (1948–2009), actor
 Paul Deen (1915–1990), actor
 Antoon Derkinderen (1859–1925) painter, Glass artist and designer of book covers.
 Tofik Dibi (1980), politicus
 Dominique van Dijk (1979), football player
 Ellen van Dijk (1987), Dutch cyclist, lived in Amsterdam from 2008 to 2014
 Jasper van Dijk (1971), politicus
 Boris Dittrich (born 1955) politician 
 Joost Divendal (1955–2010)
 Jan Hein Donner (1927–1988) chess grandmaster 
 Mary Dresselhuys (1907–2004) stage actress
 Niesco Dubbelboer (1962), politicus
 André van Duin (born 1947) comedian, actor, singer-songwriter and author
 Marlene Dumas (born 1953) South African artist and painter

E 
 Jon van Eerd (1960)
 Norbert Elias (1897–1990) a German sociologist
 Beau van Erven Dorens (born 1970) TV presenter, actor and voice actor.
 Andrée van Es (1953), politicus

F 

 Bobby Farrell (1949–2010) dancer and singer with Boney M.
 Stefan Felsenthal (1933–2007)
 Govert Flinck (1615–1660) painter. 
 Sander Foppele (1977)
 Anne Frank (1929–1945) diarist and victim of the Holocaust

G 
 Miep Gies (1909–2010) hid Dutch Jews, including Anne Frank, from the Nazis
 Angela Groothuizen (born 1959), singer with Dolly Dots, artist and TV personality.

H 

 Hella Haasse (1918–2011) writer, the "Grande Dame" of Dutch literature
 Femke Halsema (born 1966), politician, Mayor of Amsterdam since 2018
 Eddy Hamel (1902–1943), Jewish-American soccer player for Dutch club AFC Ajax who was killed by the Nazis in Auschwitz concentration camp
 Johannes Heesters (1903–2011) actor of stage, TV and film and vocalist 
 A.F.Th. van der Heijden (1951), writer
 Youp van 't Hek (born 1954) comedian, author, columnist and singer-songwriter.
 Meindert Hobbema (1638–1709), landscape painter.
 Wim Hogenkamp (1947–1989) actor, lyricist and singer.
 Jodocus Hondius (1563–1612) engraver and cartographer. 
 Ellen Hoog (1986), hockey player
 Nan Hoover (1931–2008) video art, installation art, photography and drawing
 Carice van Houten (1976), actor

I 

 Ralph Inbar (1938–2004)
 Ewout Irrgang (1976), politicus

J 
 Tanja Jadnanansing (1967), politicus
 Cas Jansen (1977), actor
 Robert Jensen (1973)
 Trude de Jong (1946)
 Johannes Hendricus Jurres (1875–1946), painter

K 

 Paul Kalma (1948), politicus
 Jort Kelder (born 1964) journalist, TV presenter and former magazine editor
 Frans Kellendonk (1951–1990), writer and translator
 Reinier Cornelis Keller (1905–1981)
 Mensje van Keulen (1946), writer
 Jan van Kilsdonk (1917–2008)
 Pieter Klaver (1890–1970)
 Adriënne Kleiweg (1948), actor
 Marc Klein Essink (1960)
 Raymond van de Klundert (1964; also known as Kluun), writer
 Kokadorus (1867–1934)
 Howard Komproe (1971)
 Martijn Koning (1978)
 Jeroen van Koningsbrugge (born 1973) actor, comedian, singer, director and presenter.
 Jos van der Kooy (1951)
 Adriaan Kortlandt (1918–2009) ethologist (the scientific study of animal behaviour)
 Hildo Krop (1884–1970) sculptor and furniture designer
 Ton Kuyl (1921–2010), actor

L 

 Gerard de Lairesse (1640–1711) painter and art theorist.
 Manfred Langer (1952–1994)
 John Leerdam (1961), politicus
 Paul de Leeuw (born 1962) TV comedian, singer and actor.
 Ton Lensink (1922–1997)
 Søren Lerby (1958), football player and sport manager
 Isaäc Abraham Levy (1836–1920)
 Stan Limburg (1961)
 Nico ter Linden (1936)
 Margriet van der Linden (1970)
 Patrick Lodiers (born 1971) TV presenter
 Jamai Loman (born 1986) singer

M 

 Anouk Maas (1987)
 Gerard Maas (1913–1988)
 Bridget Maasland (born 1974) TV presenter and producer.
 Geert Mak (born 1946) journalist and non-fiction writer.
 Ahmed Marcouch (born 1969) politician, Mayor of Arnhem since 2017.
 Jan Floris Martinet (1729–1795)
 Peer Mascini (1941–2019), actor
 Bea Meulman (1949), actor
 Felix Meurders (1946)
 Mary Michon (1939–2011)
 Hans van Mierlo (1931–2010)
 Johnny de Mol (born 1979) actor and presenter.
 Harry Mulisch (1927–2010), writer

N 

 Marlene van Niekerk (born 1954) South African poet, writer, and academic.

O 
 Maria Oestreicher (1936–2009)
 Willem Oltmans (1925–2004), journalist
 Mark Omvlee (1977)

P 
 Connie Palmen (born 1955) author
 Satyendra Pakhale (born India 1967) designer, industrial designer and architect.
 David Pardo (ca.1591–1657), rabbi, born at Salonica
 Schelto Patijn (1936–2007) politician, Mayor of Amsterdam, 1994-2001.
 Pearl Perlmuter (1915–2008)
 Alexander Pola (1914–1992; real name: Abraham Polak)
 Henriette Polak (1893–1974)
 Benno Premsela (1920–1997) designer, visual artist and art collector.

R 

 Ronald van Raak (1969), politicus
 Prem Radhakishun (born 1962) lawyer, columnist, actor and radio and TV producer.
 Joan Remmelts (1905–1987)
 Rembrandt van Rijn (1606/7–1669) painter, printmaker and draughtsman. 
 Louis Royer (1793–1868) sculptor
 Gerda Rubinstein (1931) sculptor of figures, birds and animals
 Renate Rubinstein (1929–1990) writer, journalist and columnist.
 Michiel de Ruyter (1607–1676) admiral.

S 

 Ivo Samkalden (1912–1995) politician, Mayor of Amsterdam, 1967-1977.
 Jolande Sap (1963), politicus
 Annie M.G. Schmidt (1911–1995) writer, the mother of the Dutch theatrical song
 Merijn Scholten (1983)
 Manon Sikkel (1965)
 Nina Simone (1933–2003) American singer, songwriter, musician and civil rights activist.
 Joke Smit (1933–1981) feminist and politician
 Wim Sonneveld (1917–1974) cabaret artist and singer
 Ed Spanjaard (born 1948) classical conductor and pianist.
 Gitte Spee (1950), children's book illustrator 
 Jack Spijkerman (1948)
 Jeroen Spitzenberger (born 1976) actor
 Abraham Staalman (1871–1935), politicus
 Carel Struycken (born 1948) actor
 Jan Pieterszoon Sweelinck (1562–1621)  composer, organist, and pedagogue

T 

 Humberto Tan (1965) radio and TV presenter, sports journalist and writer
 Paul Tang (1967), politicus
 Gerard Thoolen (1943–1996), actor
 Liesbeth van Tongeren (born 1958) politician and director of Greenpeace Netherlands
 Willem Treub (1858–1931) politician.

U 
 Joop den Uyl (1919–1987) politician, Prime Minister of the Netherlands, 1973 to 1977.

V 

 Serge-Henri Valcke (1946)
 Kees Vendrik (1963), politicus
 Georgina Verbaan (born 1979) actress and singer. 
 Roué Verveer (1972)
 Florian Vijent (1961–1989), football player
 Hendrik Verwoerd (1901-1966), Prime Minister of South Africa, 1958-1966
 Mart Visser (born 1968) fashion designer.
 Joost van den Vondel (1587–1679) poet, writer and playwright.
 Joël Voordewind (1965), politicus
 Mei Li Vos (1970) politician
 Willem Vroom (1850–1925)

W 
 Floor Wibaut (1859–1936)
 Willy Wielek-Berg (1919–2004) translator, film critic, writer and resistance fighter.
 Ruud de Wild (born 1969) radio host. 
 Harry de Winter (1949)
 Willem Wittkampf (1924–1992)

Z 
 Chris Zegers (1971)

Mayors of Amsterdam

See also

 List of Dutch people
 List of Frisians

References

 
Amsterdam
People